1856 Sydney City colonial by-election may refer to 

 1856 Sydney City colonial by-election 1 held on 4 September 1856
 1856 Sydney City colonial by-election 2 held on 30 December 1856

See also
 List of New South Wales state by-elections